25I-NBOH (NBOH-2CI, Cimbi-27, 2-C-I-NBOH) is a derivative of the phenethylamine-derived hallucinogen 2C-I that was discovered in 2006 by a team at Purdue University.

Pharmacology
25I-NBOH acts as a potent agonist of the 5HT2A receptor, with a Ki of 0.061 nM at the human 5HT2A receptor, similar to the better-known compound 25I-NBOMe, making it some twelve times the potency of 2C-I itself.

Although in vitro tests show this compound acts as an agonist, animal studies to confirm these findings have not been reported. While the N-benzyl derivatives of 2C-I had significantly increased binding to 5HT2A receptor fragments, compared to 2C-I, the N-benzyl derivatives of DOI were less active compared to DOI. 

25I-NBOH is notable as one of the most selective agonist ligands for the 5-HT2A receptor with an EC50 value of 0.074 nM with more than 400 times selectivity over the 5-HT2C receptor.

Analytical chemistry
25I-NBOH is a labile molecule which fragments into 2C-I when analyzed by routine gas chromatography (GC) methods.  A specific method for reliable identification of 25I-NBOH using GC/MS has been reported, allowing forensic forces worldwide to correctly identify this compound.

Legality

Sweden
The Riksdag added 25I-NBOH to  under Swedish schedule I ("substances, plant materials and fungi which normally do not have medical use") as of August 18, 2015, published by Medical Products Agency MPA) in regulation HSLF-FS 2015:12 listed as "25I-NBOH" and "2-([2-(4-jodo-2,5-dimetoxifenyl)etylamino]metyl)fenol".

United Kingdom

Analogues and derivatives

References 

25-NB (psychedelics)
Designer drugs
Iodoarenes
Serotonin receptor agonists